The Rur or Roer (Dutch and , ,) is a major river that flows through portions of Belgium, Germany and the Netherlands. It is a right (eastern) tributary to the Meuse.  About 90 percent of the river's course is in Germany.

It is not to be confused with the rivers Ruhr and Röhr, which are tributaries of the Rhine in North Rhine-Westphalia.

Geography

South of Monschau it flows into Germany, through North Rhine-Westphalia. It flows first through the northern part of the Eifel mountains.

After  it reaches the Rur Reservoir, the second-largest artificial lake in Germany. After approximately  it flows into the Netherlands, and at its  mark it flows into the river Meuse in the town of Roermond.

Major tributaries of the Rur include the Inde and the Wurm. The towns along the Rur are Monschau, Heimbach, Nideggen, Düren, Jülich, Linnich, Hückelhoven, Heinsberg (all in Germany) and Roermond (Netherlands).

In the 1960s and 1970s, the northern part of the Rur was heavily polluted by the tailings of many German coal mines. Neither fish nor other organisms could be found, and it was dangerous to swim in the river. Foam flakes regularly flooded parts of the city of Roermond. After the closure of the mines, the waste water treatment in Germany and the Netherlands greatly improved. Only the lower part of the river is still contaminated. The water in the upper part of the river is so clean that trout and more than 30 species of fish are back. After an absence of 125 years, salmon returned to the Rur in 2004.

Tributaries

 Ellebach
 Inde
 Kall
 Malefinkbach
 Merzbach
 Wurm
 Olef
 Urft

History
During the Middle Ages the valley of the Rur lay mostly within the Duchy of Jülich. In 1795,  until 1814, during which time the area was part of the French Republic and Empire, it gave its name to the French département of the Roer.

The Rur represented an important front in the Allied push towards Germany at the end of the Second World War. A fortified area known as the Roer Triangle, formed by the towns of Roermond and Sittard,  in the Netherlands, and Heinsberg in Germany, was the scene of heavy fighting at the beginning of 1945.

Operation Blackcock was the code name for the clearing of the Roer Triangle. It was conducted by the 2nd British Army between 14 and 26 January 1945. The objective was to drive the German 15th Army back across the Rivers Rur and Wurm and move the frontline further into Germany. The operation was carried out under command of the XII Corps by three divisions. The operation is relatively unknown despite the sometimes fierce battles that were fought for each and every village and hamlet within the "Roer Triangle".

Between 16 December 1944 and 23 February 1945, the U.S. Ninth Army was unable to advance across the Rur during Operation Queen, because German forces controlled dams close to the river's source in the densely forested region of the Hohes Venn.  This meant Axis forces could potentially blow the dams, releasing enough water to wash out an Allied assault.  At the same time, the German  Ardennes Offensive meant any further westward push would leave Allied forces stretched and supply lines exposed. Eventually the counteroffensive was overwhelmed and German engineers, under pressure of aerial and artillery bombardment, released the dams.  As the flood waters began to subside, Allied forces crossed the Rur in rafts in the early hours of February 23, 1945, as part of Operation Grenade.

Recreation
The Rur is the only real white water river in North Rhine-Westphalia. The upper section above the Rur reservoir  (German: Rurtalsperre Schwammenauel) offers  of white water ranging from class III(+) to I. The town of Monschau is the venue for the yearly International White Water Race which was held on 17 March 2013 for the 58th time.

See also
Rurtalbahn (Rur Valley Railway) — tracks run approximately along the river, from Heimbach to Linnich.

References

External links

 Roercrossing of the 102. Infantry Division 1944/45 documents and photos

 
International rivers of Europe
Rivers of the Ardennes (Belgium)
Rivers of Belgium
Rivers of the Netherlands
Rivers of Liège Province
Rivers of Limburg (Netherlands)
Rivers of North Rhine-Westphalia
Roerdalen
Roermond
Rivers of the Eifel
Rivers of Germany